Chris Hermansen (born 23 January 1975) is a retired football player, who most notably won the 1999 Danish Cup with Akademisk Boldklub (AB). He played as a forward and scored 73 goals in 174 games in the Danish Superliga from 1996 to 2004. Hermansen played five games for Danish youth selections, including three games for the Denmark national under-21 football team.

During his club career, Hermansen played for Esbjerg fB, 1. FC Köln, Ikast FS, Herfølge BK, AB, Vejle BK and Kolding FC.

After retiring as a player, Hermansen took up coaching, and became the coach in the football club Løsning IF.

Hermansen was part of the Herfølge squad that won the 1999–2000 Danish Superliga, having re-joined them half way through that season from AB.

References

External links
 
 

1975 births
Living people
Danish men's footballers
Denmark under-21 international footballers
Denmark youth international footballers
People from Esbjerg
Association football forwards
Danish Superliga players
Danish 1st Division players
Esbjerg fB players
1. FC Köln players
Ikast FS players
Herfølge Boldklub players
Akademisk Boldklub players
Vejle Boldklub players
Kolding FC players
Danish expatriate men's footballers
Expatriate footballers in Germany
Sportspeople from the Region of Southern Denmark